1111 19th Street is a high-rise office building in Washington, D.C. The building rises 12 floors and  in height. The building was designed by architectural firm Heery International and was completed in 1979.

See also
List of tallest buildings in Washington, D.C.

References

External links

Skyscraper office buildings in Washington, D.C.

Office buildings completed in 1979
1979 establishments in Washington, D.C.